Steven Van Vooren (born 5 October 1986 in Ghent) is a Belgian racing cyclist.

Palmarès
2008
1st Stage 1a Tour of Pennsylvania
2009
1st Ronde de l'Oise

References

1986 births
Living people
Belgian male cyclists
Sportspeople from Ghent
Cyclists from East Flanders